Proteasome activator complex subunit 2 is a protein that in humans is encoded by the PSME2 gene.

Function 

The 26S proteasome is a multicatalytic proteinase complex with a highly ordered structure composed of 2 complexes, a 20S core and a 19S regulator. The 20S core is composed of 4 rings of 28 non-identical subunits; 2 rings are composed of 7 alpha subunits and 2 rings are composed of 7 beta subunits. The 19S regulator is composed of a base, which contains 6 ATPase subunits and 2 non-ATPase subunits, and a lid, which contains up to 10 non-ATPase subunits. Proteasomes are distributed throughout eukaryotic cells at a high concentration and cleave peptides in an ATP/ubiquitin-dependent process in a non-lysosomal pathway.  An essential function of a modified proteasome, the immunoproteasome, is the processing of class I MHC peptides. The immunoproteasome contains an alternate regulator, referred to as the 11S regulator or PA28, that replaces the 19S regulator. Three subunits (alpha, beta and gamma) of the 11S regulator have been identified. This gene encodes the beta subunit of the 11S regulator, one of the two 11S subunits that is induced by gamma-interferon. Three beta and three alpha subunits combine to form a heterohexameric ring. Six pseudogenes have been identified on chromosomes 4, 5, 8, 10 and 13.

Interactions 

PSME2 has been shown to interact with PSME1.

References

Further reading